White night, White Night, or White Nights may refer to:

 White night (astronomy), a night in which it never gets completely dark, at high latitudes outside the Arctic and Antarctic Circles
 White Night festivals, all-night arts festivals held in many cities worldwide in the summer
 White Nights Festival, an annual arts festival in St. Petersburg, Russia during the season of the midnight sun

Literature 
 White Night (The Dresden Files), a 2007 book by Jim Butcher
 White Night, a 2004 novel by Keigo Higashino
 White Nights (book), an autobiographical memoir by Menachem Begin, the sixth Prime Minister of Israel
 "White Nights" (short story) by Dostoevsky

Film and TV 
 White Night (1968 film), a 1968 South Korean film
 White Night (2009 film), a South Korean mystery thriller
 White Night (2012 film), a South Korean romantic drama
 White Night (2017 film), a Canadian comedy-drama anthology
 White Nights (1916 film), directed by Alexander Korda
 White Nights (1957 film), by Luchino Visconti
 White Nights (1985 film), a 1985 film starring Mikhail Baryshnikov and Gregory Hines
 Night Light, South Korean TV series also known as White Nights

Music 
 White Nights (soundtrack), the soundtrack for the 1985 film, White Nights
 White Night (album), 2017, Taeyang's third studio album
 "White Night", a song by Amorphis from the 2015 album Under the Red Cloud
 "White Nights" (song), a 2011 song by Oh Land
 White Nights (radio), 2006 series
 White Night World Tour, a 2017 concert tour by South Korean singer Taeyang

Other uses 
 White Night (Jonestown), practice at Peoples Temple Agricultural Project, aka Jonestown
 White Nights (badminton), an open international badminton tournament in Russia
 White Night riots, unrelated to the astronomical phenomenon
 White Night (video game), a 2015 video game by Activision

See also 
 Nuit Blanche, an annual all-night or night-time arts festival
 White knight (disambiguation)